Jürgen Pfeiffer is a German rower who competed for East Germany.

Pfeiffer grew up near Gera. He was twice world champion alongside Gert Uebeler in coxed pair. At the 1978 World Rowing Championships at Lake Karapiro, New Zealand, they became world champions with Olaf Beyer as coxswain. They defended their title at the 1979 World Rowing Championships in Bled, Yugoslavia, with Georg Spohr as coxswain.

References

External links

Year of birth missing (living people)
East German male rowers
World Rowing Championships medalists for East Germany
Living people
Sportspeople from Thuringia